Codium perriniae is a species of seaweed in the Codiaceae family.

In Western Australia is found along the coast in the Mid West regions extending along the south coast as far as Victoria and the north coast of Tasmania.

References

perriniae
Plants described in 1935